Yamanpalli is a village in Mutharam(Mahadevpur) mandal in Jayashankar district in the state of Telangana in India.

References

Villages in East Godavari district